Aquatic turtles may refer to:

Red-eared slider---- Trachemys scripta elegans.
Pond slider---- Trachemys scripta.
Northern map turtle---- Graptemys geographica.
Mud turtle---- Kinosternon.
Western pond turtle---- Actinemys marmorata.

Animal common name disambiguation pages